Muñoz Airstrip was a dirt airstrip located South of Bahía de los Ángeles, Municipality of Ensenada, Baja California, Mexico, a town located on the Gulf of California coast. The HLM code was used as identifier.

External links
 Info about Bahía de los Ángeles and its two airstrips.
 Baja Bush Pilots Forum about Muñoz Airstrip.

See also
 Bahía de los Ángeles
 Baja California

Defunct airports in Baja California